Mouriri laxiflora is a species of plant in the family Melastomataceae. It is endemic to Ecuador.  Its natural habitat is subtropical or tropical moist lowland forests. It is threatened by habitat loss.

References

laxiflora
Endemic flora of Ecuador
Near threatened plants
Taxonomy articles created by Polbot